The St. Thomas Tommies baseball team was a baseball team that represented the University of St. Thomas (Minnesota) in the 2022 NCAA Division I baseball season. The Tommies were members of the Summit League and played their home games at Koch Diamond in Saint Paul, Minnesota. They were led by thirteenth-year head coach Chris Olean.

Previous season
The Tommies finished the 2021 NCAA Division III baseball season 37–10 overall (17–2 conference) and first place in conference standings.  Following the conclusion of the regular season, the Tommies were selected to play in the 2021 NCAA Tournament, beginning in the Collegeville Regional. The Tommies would eventually win the Regional advancing to the College World Series, where they lost in the National Championship Series 0–2 to Salisbury Sea Gulls.

Preseason Summit poll
For the 2022 poll, St. Thomas was projected to finish in seventh in the Conference.

Roster

Schedule

! style="" | Regular Season
|- valign="top"

|- align="center" bgcolor="#ffcccc"
| 1 || February 18 || || at FIU || Infinity Insurance Park • University Park, Florida || 3–4 || Tiburcio (1–0) || Constertina (0–1) || None || 745 || 0–1 || –
|- align="center" bgcolor="#ffcccc"
| 2 || February 19 || || at FIU || Infinity Insurance Park • University Park, Florida || 1–3 || Clemente (1–0) || Gartner (0–1) || Lequerica (1) || – || 0–2 || –
|- align="center" bgcolor="#ffcccc"
| 3 || February 19 || || at FIU || Infinity Insurance Park • University Park, Florida || 1–3 || Hernandez (1–0) || Esch (0–1) || None || – || 0–3 || –
|- align="center" bgcolor="#ffcccc"
| 4 || February 20 || || at FIU || Infinity Insurance Park • University Park, Florida || 3–9 || Cabarcas (1–0) || Chiriboga (0–1) || None || – || 0–4 || –
|- align="center" bgcolor="#ccffcc"
| 5 || February 25 || || vs  || Malcolm U. Pitt Field • Richmond, Virginia || 2–0 || Retz (1–0) || Jeter (0–1) || Laubscher (1) || 35 || 1–4 || –
|- align="center" bgcolor="#ffcccc"
| 6 || February 25 || || at  || Malcolm U. Pitt Field • Richmond, Virginia || 3–4 || Kimbell (1–0) || Constertina (0–2) || None || 150 || 1–5 || –
|- align="center" bgcolor="#ccffcc"
| 7 || February 26 || || Sacred Heart || Malcolm U. Pitt Field • Richmond, Virginia || 3–2 || Coborn (1–0) || Attonito (0–1) || None || 55 || 2–5 || –
|-

|- align="center" bgcolor="#ffcccc"
| 8 || March 1 || || at  || U.S. Bank Stadium • Minneapolis, Minnesota || 0–12 || Liffrig (1–1) || Laubscher (0–1) || None || 400 || 2–6 || –
|- align="center" bgcolor="#ffcccc"
| 9 || March 4 || || at  || Charles Schwab Field Omaha • Omaha, Nebraska || 1–3 || Tebrake (1–1) || Retz (1–1) || Steier (1) || 1,455 || 2–7 || –
|- align="center" bgcolor="#bbbbbb"
| – || March 5 || || at Creighton || Charles Schwab Field Omaha • Omaha, Nebraska ||colspan=12| Game cancelled 
|- align="center" bgcolor="#ffcccc"
| 10 || March 6 || || at Creighton || Charles Schwab Field Omaha • Omaha, Nebraska || 2–3 || Lidd (1–0) || Laubscher (0–2) || None || 1,107 || 2–8 || –
|- align="center" bgcolor="#bbbbbb"
| – || March 9 || || at Iowa || Duane Banks Field • Iowa City, Iowa ||colspan=12| Game cancelled 
|- align="center" bgcolor="#bbbbbb"
| – || March 11 || || at Northwestern || Rocky Miller Park • Evanston, Illinois ||colspan=12| Game cancelled 
|- align="center" bgcolor="#bbbbbb"
| – || March 12 || || at Northwestern || Rocky Miller Park • Evanston, Illinois ||colspan=12| Game cancelled 
|- align="center" bgcolor="#ffcccc"
| 11 || March 13 || || at Northwestern || Rocky Miller Park • Evanston, Illinois || 0–9 || Sullivan (2–0) || Laubscher (0–3) || None || 245 || 2–9 || –
|- align="center" bgcolor="#ffcccc"
| 12 || March 13 || || at Northwestern || Rocky Miller Park • Evanston, Illinois || 2–3 || Utagawa (2–0) || Schewe (0–1) || None || 290 || 2–10 || –
|- align="center" bgcolor="#ffcccc"
| 13 || March 16 || || at  || Robert W. Plaster Athletic Complex • Cedar Rapids, Iowa || 2–11 || Lodge (2–1) || Blesch (0–1) || None || – || 2–11 || –
|- align="center" bgcolor="#ccffcc"
| 14 || March 16 || || vs  || Robert W. Plaster Athletic Complex • Cedar Rapids, Iowa || 14–1 || Coborn (2–0) || Marquez (0–1) || None || – || 3–11 || –
|- align="center" bgcolor="#ffcccc"
| 15 || March 21 || || at Iowa || Duane Banks Field • Iowa City, Iowa || 5–6 || Beutel (1–0) || Dailey (0–1) || Llewellyn (2) || 657 || 3–12 || –
|- align="center" bgcolor="#ffcccc"
| 16 || March 25 || || at  || Tal Anderson Field • Omaha, Nebraska || 1–6 || Riedel (1–2) || Laubscher (0–4) || None || 383 || 3–13 || 0–1
|- align="center" bgcolor="#ccffcc"
| 17 || March 26 || || at Omaha || Tal Anderson Field • Omaha, Nebraska || 8–6 || Constertina (1–2) || Kreiling (1–2) || None || 459 || 4–13 || 1–1
|- align="center" bgcolor="#ffcccc"
| 18 || March 27 || || at Omaha || Tal Anderson Field • Omaha, Nebraska || 2–3 || Sellers (1–0) || Coborn (2–1) || None || 306 || 4–14 || 1–2
|- align="center" bgcolor="#bbbbbb"
| – || March 30 || ||  || Koch Diamond • St. Paul, Minnesota ||colspan=12| Game cancelled 
|-

|- align="center" bgcolor="#ffcccc"
| 19 || April 2 || ||  || Koch Diamond • St. Paul, Minnesota || 3–5 || McCay (1–2) || Laubscher (0–5) || Bourassa (2) || 275 || 4–15 || 1–3
|- align="center" bgcolor="#ffcccc"
| 20 || April 3 || || South Dakota State || Koch Diamond • St. Paul, Minnesota || 1–2 || Carlson (4–3) || Esch (0–1) || Barnett (4) || 160 || 4–16 || 1–4
|- align="center" bgcolor="#ffcccc"
| 21 || April 3 || || South Dakota State || Koch Diamond • St. Paul, Minnesota || 1–6 || Bishop (2–2) || Schewe (0–2) || None || 100 || 4–17 || 1–5
|- align="center" bgcolor="#bbbbbb"
| – || April 5 || ||  || Koch Diamond • St. Paul, Minnesota ||colspan=12| Game cancelled 
|- align="center" bgcolor="#ccffcc"
| 22 || April 9 || || North Dakota State || Koch Diamond • St. Paul, Minnesota || 6–0 || Laubscher (1–5) || Loven (4–2) || None || 310 || 5–17 || 2–5
|- align="center" bgcolor="#ffcccc"
| 23 || April 9 || || North Dakota State || Koch Diamond • St. Paul, Minnesota || 1–4 || Feeney (4–1) || Esch (0–3) || Drew (5) || 265 || 5–18 || 2–6
|- align="center" bgcolor="#ffcccc"
| 24 || April 10 || || North Dakota State || Koch Diamond • St. Paul, Minnesota || 7–8 || Roehrich (4–1) || Gartner (0–2) || None || 205 || 5–19 || 2–7
|- align="center" bgcolor="#ffcccc"
| 25 || April 13 || || at Minnesota || Siebert Field • Minneapolis, Minnesota || 1–2 || Novotny (1–0) || Cano (0–1) || Semb (2) || 260 || 5–20 || 2–7
|- align="center" bgcolor="#ffcccc"
| 26 || April 15 || || at  || Cecil Ballow Baseball Complex • Stephenville, Texas || 5–6 || Hickey (2–1) || Klick (0–1) || None || 348 || 5–21 || 2–7
|- align="center" bgcolor="#ccffcc"
| 27 || April 15 || || at Tarleton State || Cecil Ballow Baseball Complex • Stephenville, Texas || 11–9 || Millar (2–0) || Ross (0–1) || Chiriboga (1) || 289 || 6–21 || 2–7
|- align="center" bgcolor="#ccffcc"
| 28 || April 16 || || at Tarleton State || Cecil Ballow Baseball Complex • Stephenville, Texas || 6–3 || Nigut (1–0) || Hackett (2–5) || Cano (1) || 325 || 7–21 || 2–7
|- align="center" bgcolor="#ccffcc"
| 29 || April 19 || || at Minnesota || Siebert Field • Minneapolis, Minnesota || 6–0 || Gartner (1–2) || Novotny (1–1) || None || 327 || 8–21 || 2–7
|- align="center" bgcolor="#ccffcc"
| 30 || April 23 || ||  || Koch Diamond • St. Paul, Minnesota || 5–4 || Constertina (2–2) || Colehower (0–1) || None || 120 || 8–21 || 3–7
|- align="center" bgcolor="#ffcccc"
| 31 || April 23 || || Northern Colorado || Koch Diamond • St. Paul, Minnesota || 4–7 || Mansur (4–2) || Coburn (0–2) || Chase (2) || 100 || 9–22 || 3–8
|- align="center" bgcolor="#ccffcc"
| 32 || April 24 || || Northern Colorado || Koch Diamond • St. Paul, Minnesota || 8–6 || Cano (1–1) || Metz (0–5) || None || 110 || 10–22 || 4–8
|- align="center" bgcolor="#ffcccc"
| 33 || April 27 || || at Minnesota || Siebert Field • Minneapolis, Minnesota || 0–9 || Holetz (1–2) || Millar (1–1) || None || – || 10–23 || 4–8
|- align="center" bgcolor="#ccffcc"
| 34 || April 29 || ||  || Koch Diamond • St. Paul, Minnesota || 4–11 || Laubscher (2–5) || Warkentien (1–6) || Constertina (1) || 110 || 11–23 || 5–8
|- align="center" bgcolor="#ffcccc"
| 35 || April 29 || || Western Illinois || Koch Diamond • St. Paul, Minnesota || 1–11 || Fochs (2–4) || Gartner (1–3) || None || 100 || 11–24 || 5–9
|-

|- align="center" bgcolor="#ccffcc"
| 36 || May 1 || || Western Illinois || Koch Diamond • St. Paul, Minnesota || 12–2 || Esch (1–3) || Raymond (0–2) || Coborn (1) || 100 || 12–24 || 6–9
|- align="center" bgcolor="#bbbbbb"
| – || May 3 || || at  || Franklin Field • Franklin, Wisconsin ||colspan=12| Game cancelled 
|- align="center" bgcolor="#bbbbbb"
| – || May 3 || || at Milwaukee || Franklin Field • Franklin, Wisconsin ||colspan=12| Game cancelled 
|- align="center" bgcolor="#ffcccc"
| 37 || May 6 || || at  || J. L. Johnson Stadium • Tulsa, Oklahoma || 6–7 || Denton (3–0) || Constertina (2–3) || None || 892 || 12–25 || 6–10
|- align="center" bgcolor="#ccffcc"
| 38 || May 7 || || at Oral Roberts || J. L. Johnson Stadium • Tulsa, Oklahoma || 4–3 || Laubscher (3–5) || Smith (6–4) || Constertina (2) || 1,048 || 13–25 || 7–10
|- align="center" bgcolor="#ffcccc"
| 39 || May 8 || || at Oral Roberts || J. L. Johnson Stadium • Tulsa, Oklahoma || 0–14 || Coffey (5–5) || Esch (1–4) || None || 750 || 13–26 || 7–11
|- align="center" bgcolor="#bbbbbb"
| – || May 10 || || at  || Duffy Bass Field • Normal, Illinois ||colspan=12| Game cancelled
|- align="center" bgcolor="#ffcccc"
| 40 || May 13 || || at South Dakota State || Erv Huether Field • Brookings, South Dakota || 4–11 || McCay (4–3) || Laubschar (3–6) || Bourassa (5) || 84 || 13–27 || 7–12
|- align="center" bgcolor="#ffcccc"
| 41 || May 14 || || at South Dakota State || Erv Huether Field • Brookings, South Dakota || 0–9 || Carlson (6–5) || Coborn (2–3) || None || 129 || 13–28 || 7–13
|- align="center" bgcolor="#ffcccc"
| 42 || May 15 || || at South Dakota State || Erv Huether Field • Brookings, South Dakota || 2–11 || Bishop (4–3) || Esch (1–5) || None || 129 || 13–29 || 7–14
|- align="center" bgcolor="#ccffcc"
| 43 || May 19 || || Omaha || Koch Diamond • St. Paul, Minnesota || 6–4 || Schlecht (1–0) || Blunt (1–2) || Cano (2) || 115 || 14–29 || 8–14
|- align="center" bgcolor="#ccffcc"
| 44 || May 20 || || Omaha || Koch Diamond • St. Paul, Minnesota || 5–2 || Coborn (3–3) || Sellers (3–2) || Constertina (3) || 160 || 15–29 || 9–14
|- align="center" bgcolor="#ccffcc"
| 45 || May 21 || || Omaha || Jack Ruhr Field • Miesville, Minnesota || 9–8 || Laubscher (4–6) || Gordon (0–3) || Constertina (4) || 405 || 16–29 || 10–14

|}

Awards

Summit League Players of the Week

References

St. Thomas
St. Thomas (Minnesota) Tommies baseball seasons
St. Thomas